Sığırlı (also, Sagiri, Sagiry, Sagyrly, and Sygyrly) is a village and municipality in the Kurdamir Rayon of Azerbaijan.

References

 

Populated places in Kurdamir District